Karunaratne Amarasinghe is one of the distinguished media personnel in Sri Lanka who was awarded by the Presidential Media Award in 2018. He is also known as a senior announcers of SLBC and an Author. Amarasinghe was born at Kalubowila and educated at Buddhagosha Maha Vidyalaya Kalubowila and St. John's College, Nugegoda.

References

External links
 Listen to the voices of some of the veteran announcers of SLBC/Radio Ceylon

Sri Lankan radio personalities
Sri Lankan Buddhists
Year of birth missing (living people)
Living people